Parananochromis is a genus of cichlids native to tropical Africa.

Species
There are currently 8 recognized species in this genus:
 Parananochromis axelrodi Lamboj & Stiassny, 2003
 Parananochromis brevirostris Lamboj & Stiassny, 2003
 Parananochromis caudifasciatus (Boulenger, 1913)
 Parananochromis elobatus Lamboj, 2014 
 Parananochromis gabonicus Trewavas, 1975
 Parananochromis longirostris (Boulenger, 1903)
 Parananochromis ornatus Lamboj & Stiassny, 2003
 Parananochromis orsorum Lamboj, 2014

References

Chromidotilapiini
Cichlid genera
Taxa named by Humphry Greenwood